This is a list of notable Chinese restaurants. A Chinese restaurant is an establishment that serves Chinese cuisine outside China. Some have distinctive styles, as with American Chinese cuisine and Canadian Chinese cuisine. Most of them are in the Cantonese restaurant style. Chinese takeouts (United States and Canada) or Chinese takeaways (United Kingdom and Commonwealth) are also found either as components of eat-in establishments or as separate establishments, and serve a take-out version of Chinese cuisine.

Chinese restaurants 

 Asia Town
 Bianyifang
 Café de Coral
 Celeste Imperio
 Chengdu Taste
 China Coast
 China Tang
 CNHLS
 Chinese Gourmet Express
 Crystal Jade Culinary Concept Holdings
 Din Tai Fung
 Dough Zone
 East Dawning
 Fairwood
 Flower Drum, Melbourne, Australia
 Fuchun Teahouse, Yangzhou, Jiangsu, China
 Gado Gado, Portland, Oregon
 Guo Li Zhuang
 Hakkasan, London, U.K.
 Heichinrou
 Jing Fong
 Joe's Shanghai
 Joy Hing's Roasted Meat, Hong Kong
 Jumbo Kingdom
 Jumbo Seafood
 Kai Mayfair
 Kuo Yuan
 Leeann Chin
 Little Sheep Group
 Ma Yu Ching, Kaifeng, Henan, China
 Manchu Wok
 Mandarin Restaurant
 Maxim's Catering
 Ming Palace
 Mr. Chow
 Nam Kee
 Nom Wah Tea Parlor
 Noodle Box
 P. F. Chang's
 Panda Express
 Panda Inn
 Peter Chang's
 Pick Up Stix
 Sam Woo Restaurant
 Shun Lee Palace
 Sichuan Food
 Star Seafood Floating Restaurant
 Tom's BaoBao
 West Lake Restaurant, Changsha, Hunan, China
 Wong Kei
 Xi'an Famous Foods
 Xiabu Xiabu
 Xian Heng Inn
 Yauatcha, London, U.K.
 Yung Kee, Hong Kong

United States
Notable Chinese restaurants in the United States include:

 A+ Hong Kong Kitchen, Seattle
 Ambassador Restaurant and Lounge, Portland, Oregon
 Bing Mi, Portland, Oregon
 Country Dough, Seattle
 Dim Sum King, Seattle
 Duck House Chinese Restaurant, Portland, Oregon
 Fong Chong, Portland, Oregon
 Formosa Cafe, West Hollywood, California
 Frank Fat's, Sacramento, California
 Frank's Noodle House, Oregon
 Harbor City Restaurant, Seattle
 HK Cafe, Portland, Oregon
 House of Louie, Portland, Oregon
 Hunan Restaurant, Portland, Oregon
 Hung Far Low, Portland, Oregon
 Imperial Dynasty, Hanford, California
 Jade Garden Restaurant, Seattle
 Kenny's Noodle House, Portland, Oregon
 Kim Sơn, Houston, Texas
 Mama Lu's Dumpling House, Monterey Park, California
 Master Kong, Portland, Oregon
 Mee Sum Pastry, Seattle
 Mike's Noodle House, Seattle
 Ocean City Seafood Restaurant, Portland, Oregon
 Oma's Hideaway, Portland, Oregon
 The Pagoda, Portland, Oregon
 Pike Place Chinese Cuisine, Seattle
 Republic Cafe and Ming Lounge, Portland, Oregon
 Shanghai's Best, Portland, Oregon
 Shandong, Portland, Oregon
 Stretch the Noodle, Portland, Oregon
 Tai Tung, Seattle
 Wei Wei, Portland, Oregon
 Wong's King, Portland, Oregon
 Xi'an Noodles, Seattle metropolitan area
 XLB, Portland, Oregon

See also 
 List of Chinese desserts
 List of Chinese dishes
 List of restaurants in China
 Lists of restaurants

References

External links 
 

Restaurants
 
Lists of ethnic restaurants